Ten Mile Junction Depot is a depot for LRT trains serving the Bukit Panjang LRT in Singapore. It is integrated with the Junction 10 shopping mall and The Tennery condominium, with the depot facilities and Operations Control Centre located at the third level while the first and second levels are occupied by shops. It is the first depot in Singapore to be built in an existing building and also the first LRT depot to be built.

The depot is located next to the former Ten Mile Junction LRT station. Trains entering the depot will take the first left turn instead of second left which Ten Mile Junction LRT Station uses, while the straight track is used for the maintenance area and will also allow single train cars to couple to form two car trains for two carriage operation.

LTA will be expanding the depot by acquiring the former LRT station into a stabling area for 5 to 8 more trains.

The depot is located between Phoenix station and Bukit Panjang station on the Bukit Panjang LRT line and has 2 reception tracks: 1 track Eastbound towards Bukit Panjang station and 1 track Westbound towards Phoenix station.

Delivery of light rail trains
The delivery of new light rail trains is done at the small worksite on Choa Chu Kang Road using a crane. The new trains are lifted up to the tracks, coupled with other existing LRT trains and are pushed into the depot.

References

1999 establishments in Singapore
Light Rail Transit (Singapore) depots